The Bulgarian Fourth Army was a Bulgarian field army during the Balkan Wars, World War I, and World War II.

The Balkan Wars (1912 - 13)

Balkan War (1912 - 13) 
In anticipation of the Ottoman Empire counter-offensive, the Bulgarian command on December 14, 1912, formed this army consisting of the following: Second Infantry Thracian Division, Seventh Infantry Rila Division, the Macedonian-Adrian Army and the Third Airborne Division. The commander of the army was General Stiliyan Kovachev. It reflected the Turkish attack on Bulair and the landing at Şarköy in 1913.

Second Balkan War (1913) 
The army focused on the area of Radovish, Shtip, and Kochani against the main force of the Kingdom of Serbia. With the Battle of Bregalnitsa, the war itself begins. In the Battle of Kalimantsi advancing Serbian troops are stopped, preventing them from joining the Greek army. They were heavily suppressed and took heavy losses during the battles.

They were disbanded on 6 August 1913.

World War I (1915 - 1918) 

The Fourth Army was again formed on November 25, 1915. In December of 1917, the Artillery Division of the Army was formed and a military school was established. It was composed of the Tenth Aegean Infantry Division and the Second cavalry division. The Fourth Army was disbanded in October 1918.

During this time, the Fourth Army was commanded by Stefan Toshev.

Command and staff 
 Army Commander - Lieutenant General Mihail Savov (1918) and Infantry General Stefan Toshev (1918)
 Chief of Staff of the Army - from the General Staff, Major General Stefan Azmanov (1918)
 Chief of Artillery - Major General Vladimir Vazov (1918)
 Chief of Engineering Troops - Major General Petko Tzaklev (1918)

Divisions 
 10th Infantry Division (bg), Western Thrace
 2nd Cavalry Division (bg)  - Major General Ivan Tabakov

World War II 
After the outbreak of World War II, the 4th Army was again formed in July 1940. 
It was given the task of protecting the southeast border with Turkey as part of the "Covering Front" (Прикриващ фронт) and it was composed of:
 4th Preslav Infantry Division
 6th Bdin Infantry Division 
 11th Macedonian Infantry Division.

The 4th Army had tasks assigned to them from 10 February 1941 to December 19, 1943, when they disbanded, but reformed in September 1944, when Bulgaria joined the allies.

On October 15, 1944, the army consisted of 42,494 men and 7,152 horses. From October 15 to November 14, 1944, it fought against the Germans in Vardar Macedonia during the Bregalnitsa-Strumica operation. On December 19, 1944, the army is finally disbanded.

Commanders

Notes 
 Kamburov, Georgi. Lieutenant General Assen Grekov. Sofia, Military Publishing House, 1988. pp. 116 and 123.

Sources 
 Tashev, T., Bulgarian Army 1941 - 1945 - Encyclopedic Reference Book, Sofia, 2008, Military Publishing House EOOD, pp. 368 - 369
 Todorov, T., Eftimov, T. Guide to Archival Funds 1877 - 1944. Vol. 1. Sofia, Military Publishing House, 1976.
 Kamburov, Georgi. Lieutenant General Assen Grekov. Sofia, Military Publishing House, 1988. pp. 116 and 123.

Military units and formations of the Balkan Wars
Military history of Bulgaria during World War II
Military units and formations of Bulgaria in World War II
01
Military units and formations established in 1912
Military units and formations disestablished in 1913
Military units and formations established in 1917
Military units and formations disestablished in 1918
Military units and formations established in 1941
Military units and formations disestablished in 1945